Abdelkader Wahabi (born 20 March 1964) is a Belgian boxer. He competed in the men's light welterweight event at the 1992 Summer Olympics.

References

External links
 

1964 births
Living people
Belgian male boxers
Olympic boxers of Belgium
Boxers at the 1992 Summer Olympics
People from Berkane
Light-welterweight boxers